"Duchess" is a song by the English rock band Genesis, appearing as the second track on their 1980 album, Duke.  It peaked at number 46 in the UK Singles Chart. The song is a part of the album's "hidden suite", which included "Behind the Lines", "Guide Vocal", "Turn It On Again", "Duke's Travels", and "Duke's End". It was the first Genesis song to use a drum machine.

The lyrics tell the story of the rise and fall of an ambitious soul singer. At the start of her career, she dreams of singing to large crowds, but cares more about her music than the prospect of fame. As her success increases, her dream comes true and she becomes a superstar, adored by ecstatic audiences. However, after several years at the top, she struggles to stay relevant. By caring too much about what her audience wants, the quality of her music is negatively impacted. Unable to stay in spotlight, she chooses to end her music career and fondly remembers her former superstardom.

The video for the song shows Phil Collins, Tony Banks and Mike Rutherford playing at various points around the Liverpool Empire Theatre. The drum machine used in the song (Roland CR-78) is shown at the beginning of the video.

Personnel 
 Tony Banks – keyboards, backing vocals 
 Phil Collins – vocals, drums, Roland CR-78
 Mike Rutherford – guitars, bass pedals, backing vocals

References

1980 singles
Genesis (band) songs
Rock ballads
Songs written by Phil Collins
Songs written by Tony Banks (musician)
Songs written by Mike Rutherford
1980 songs
Virgin Records singles
Charisma Records singles
Atlantic Records singles